Kinniya Bridge is the longest bridge in Sri Lanka with a length of . It crosses the lagoon area surrounded by Koddiyar Bay and Tambalagam Bay. It links Trincomalee with Kinniya, enabling civilians to cross the Kinniya lagoon to reach Kinniya and Muttur areas by the A15 highway. The bridge was completed and declared open on 20 October 2009 by President Mahinda Rajapaksa. Prior to that, the Manampitiya Bridge was Sri Lanka's longest bridge. The bridge was built with the financial assistance of the Saudi Arabian government.

See also
 Manampitiya Bridge
 Irakkandi Bridge

References

2009 establishments in Sri Lanka
Bridges completed in 2009
Bridges in Trincomalee District